Miller Smith Puckette (born 1959) is the associate director of the Center for Research in Computing and the Arts as well as a professor of music at the University of California, San Diego, where he has been since 1994.
Puckette is known for authoring Max, a graphical development environment for music and multimedia synthesis, which he developed while working at IRCAM in the late 1980s. He is also the author of Pure Data (Pd), a real-time performing platform for audio, video and graphical programming language for the creation of interactive computer music and multimedia works, written in the 1990s with input from many others in the computer music and free software communities.

Biography 
An alumnus of St. Andrew's-Sewanee School in Tennessee, Miller Puckette got involved in computer music in 1979 at MIT with Barry Vercoe. In 1979 he became a Putnam Fellow.
He earned a Ph.D. in mathematics from Harvard University in 1986 after completing an undergraduate degree at MIT in 1980. He was a member of the MIT Media Lab from its opening in 1985 until 1987 before continuing his research at IRCAM, and since 1997 has been a part of the Global Visual Music project.
He used Max to complete his first work, which is called Pluton from the second work of Manoury' series called Sonus ex Machina.
He is the 2008 SEAMUS Award Recipient.
On May 11, 2011, he received the title of Doctor Honoris Causa from the University of Mons.
On July 21, 2012, he received an Honorary Degree from Bath Spa University in recognition of his extraordinary contribution to computer music research.
He was the recipient of the Gold Medal at the 1975 Math Olympiads and the Silver Medal at the 1976 Math Olympiads.

Selected publications 
 For a full list, see: http://msp.ucsd.edu/publications.html
 
 Puckette, Miller (2004) “Who Owns our Software?: A first-person case study” Proceedings, ISEA, pp. 200–202, republished in September 2009 issue of Montréal: Communauté électroacoustique canadienne / Canadian Electroacoustic Community.
 Puckette, Miller (2002)  Computer Music Journal 26(4): pp. 31–43.

References

External links
Miller Puckette's website
Software by Miller Puckette
Theory and Techniques of Electronic Music
Visual Music Project

Living people
University of California, San Diego faculty
Harvard University alumni
International Mathematical Olympiad participants
Putnam Fellows
1959 births
MIT Media Lab people